Hololena nedra is a species of funnel weaver in the family of spiders known as Agelenidae. It is found in the United States.

References

Further reading 

 
 
 
 
 
 

Agelenidae
Articles created by Qbugbot
Spiders described in 1942
Spiders of the United States